Judith Clarke (24 August 1943 – 14 May 2020) was an Australian best-selling author of short stories for children and young adults.

Clarke was born on 24 August 1943 and raised in Sydney. She worked as a teacher, lecturer and librarian. She graduated from the University of New South Wales, and Australian National University.

Clarke died on 14 May 2020 in Melbourne.

Awards
 Young People's Talking Book of the Year Award (1991) from the Variety Club
 Boston Globe-Horn Book Honor Book in Fiction and Poetry, for Kalpana's Dream
 Children's Books of the Year Awards Winner-Children's Book Council of Australia, for Wolf on the Fold 
 Children's Books of the Year Awards Honor, Older Readers, for Night Train (Holt, 2000), by the Children's Book Council of Australia
 Victorian Premier's Literary Awards Winner, by Young Adult Fiction-State Library of Victoria, Australia
 Queensland Premier’s Literary Young Adult Book Award winner (2007) for One Whole and Perfect Day
 Michael L. Printz Honor Book, for One Whole and Perfect Day
 Prime Minister's Literary Award, Young Adult Fiction (2018) shortlisted for My Lovely Frankie

Works
 The boy on the lake: stories of the supernatural, University of Queensland Press, 1989, 
 Riffraff, H. Holt, 1992, 
Friend of my Heart, University of Queensland Press, 1994, 
Panic stations, University of Queensland Press, 1995, 
Big Night Out, Shorts, 1995, 
Lost Day, Puffin Books, 1997, 
Nighttrain, Puffin, 1998, 
Starry Nights, Allen & Unwin, 2001, 
Wolf on the Fold, Allen & Unwin, 2002, 
Kalpana's Dream, Allen & Unwin, 2004, 
 One Whole and Perfect Day, Allen & Unwin, 2006, ; (Front Street, 2007) 
The Winds of Heaven, Allen & Unwin, 2009, 
 Capsella series 
The heroic life of Al Capsella, University of Queensland Press, 1988, 
Al Capsella takes a vacation, Holt, 1993, 
My Lovely Frankie, Allen & Unwin, 2017,

References

External links
"Refreshingly Upbeat", January Magazine, Sue Bursztynski
"One Whole & Perfect Day", revish, Jaemi

1943 births
2020 deaths
Australian children's writers
Australian women children's writers
Writers from Sydney